The 2002 European Cadet Judo Championships is an edition of the European Cadet Judo Championships, organised by the International Judo Federation. It was held in Győr, Hungary from 29 to 30 June 2002.

Medal summary

Medal table

Men's events

Women's events

Source Results

References

External links
 

 U18
European Cadet Judo Championships
European Championships, U18
Judo
European 2002
Judo
Judo, European Championships U18